Battery Manufacturing Association (BMA) was a British company located in Hove. In 1952 the company entered the microcar arena with the B.M.A. Hazelcar. It was styled as a roadster with aluminium bodywork. The price of £535 meant that few were sold. Production ended in 1954.
They made approx 25 vehicles which included some electric vans.

Hazelcar
In 1949 two brothers, Eric and Roy Hazeldine, had set up a garage business in Telscombe Cliffs and Rottingdean Sussex, where they designed and built the little Hazelcar. The initial idea was to design a car that would do  and 50 miles to the gallon (5.6 L/100 km). With its transverse four cylinder engine with an end on gearbox (although mounted in the rear) and little wheels, it was the forerunner of the Mini. A petrol version of this type is currently on show in the Bentley Motor Museum in Sussex. They then joined forces with BMA.

External links
Hazelcar website

Microcars
Battery electric vehicle manufacturers
Hove